The Women of Outstanding Achievement Photographic Exhibition was an annual event organised by the UKRC. It recognised women within science, engineering and technology (SET). The exhibition was created in 2006. Between six and eight women were chosen each year to be photographed by Robert Taylor. Nominations occur in the Autumn of each year and the recipients were announced at a ceremony in March of the following year.

Many of the portraits from previous years are on permanent loan to institutions such as the University of Oxford, The Royal Society and The Royal Academy of Engineering. The portrait of scientist Nancy Rothwell was purchased by the National Portrait Gallery.

In March 2010 the exhibition opened at The Royal Academy of Engineering. Evan Harris, MP for the Liberal Democrats, unveiled the portraits.

Recent Award Recipients
Recent recipients include:
 2010 Helen Atkinson, Professor of Engineering and Head of Mechanics of Materials Research Group, University of Leicester
 2010 Sarah Baillie, Inventor and creator of the Haptic Cow and Senior Lecturer at the Royal Veterinary College
 2010 Amanda Fisher, Director of the Medical Research Council Clinical Sciences Centre at Hammersmith Hospital and Professor and Head of Division of Clinical Sciences, Imperial College, London
 2010 Julia Higgins, Former Principal of the Faculty of Engineering, Imperial College London
 2010 Jackie Hunter, Senior Vice President and Head of Science Environment Development, GlaxoSmithKline 
 2010 Helen Mason, Astrophysicist and Senior Tutor at St Edmund's College, Cambridge and lead on the Sun|Trek Project
 2009 Ann Budge, Founder and Former Chief Executive of the Sopra Group
 2009 Carolin Crawford, Senior Outreach Officer at the Institute of Astronomy at University of Cambridge and Fellow of Emmanuel College
 2009 Lynne Frostick, Professor of Geography at the University of Hull
 2009 Jenny Gristock, Research Fellow at SISSA, the International School for Advanced Studies in Trieste, Italy 
 2009 Barbara Jones, Founder and Director of amazonails
 2009 Linda Partridge, Weldon Professor of Biometry and Director of the University College London Institute of Healthy Ageing

References

External links
  WISE - successor to UKRC 

Photography exhibitions
Women in the United Kingdom
Photography in the United Kingdom
2006 establishments in the United Kingdom
Recurring events established in 2006
Annual events in the United Kingdom
Women and science
Women's events